Clemence Beatus Lyamba (born 16 February 1946) is a Tanzanian CCM politician and Member of Parliament for Mikumi constituency in the National Assembly of Tanzania since 2005.

References

Living people
Chama Cha Mapinduzi MPs
Tanzanian MPs 2010–2015
1946 births